Nimi is a language spoken in Papua New Guinea. There were about 1400 native speakers as of 1980.

References 

Finisterre languages
Languages of Morobe Province